The 2010 Copa del Sol was the inaugural edition of an annual exhibition international club football tournament held on the Costa del Sol on the south coast of Spain and was played between 3–12 February 2010.

The initial tournament featured 8 teams, Molde FK and Rosenborg BK from Norway, Kalmar FF and IF Elfsborg from Sweden, FC Copenhagen and Odense BK from Denmark, FC Shakhtar Donetsk from the Ukraine, and PFC CSKA Moscow from Russia.

The teams were divided into two groups, the Blue Group and the Red Group, with the teams placed 1st to 4th from each group meeting in the Play-off Stage to decide final positions.
 
Unfortunately, the final of the 2010 tournament wasn't able to be played due to heavy rain, so the finalists, CSKA Moscow and Shakhtar Donetsk, were declared joint winners and the prize money was shared.

Group stage

Blue Group

Red Group

Play-off stage

Seventh-place play-off

Fifth-place play-off

Third-place play-off

Final

Match was cancelled due to heavy rain. Both teams were declared joint winners.

References

Sources
https://web.archive.org/web/20110628002506/http://www.copadelsol.org/
http://shakhtar.com/en/news/12182

External links
Copa del Sol Home Page

2010
2009–10 in Ukrainian football
2009–10 in Danish football
2010 in Swedish football
2010 in Norwegian football
2010 in Russian football